WETS-FM (89.5 FM) is the National Public Radio member station for the Tri-Cities region of northeast Tennessee and southwest Virginia.  The station is operated by East Tennessee State University as a partnership between ETSU and the station’s listeners. WETS receives a little over half of its funding from listener contributions.  It also receives public funding from federal (Corporation for Public Broadcasting) and government-funded university sources. Its studios are located on the ETSU campus in Johnson City, Tennessee.  Operating 24-hours a day, the station also has a SHOUTcast webcast available on its web site.  The station also operates an FM translator at 91.5 MHz in Lenoir, North Carolina.

In addition to news and discussion programming, the station carries entertainment and music programming on the weekends, including Americana music, featuring local music from southern Appalachia.  The programming on the news and discussion front ranges from the BBC World Service to NPR programs such as Morning Edition, All Things Considered, Fresh Air, and The Diane Rehm Show to the Pacifica Radio-produced Democracy Now! program.  The airing of the left-wing Democracy Now! has proven to be controversial, since the Tri-Cities is a decidedly politically and culturally conservative region.  As such, the station lost a number of members who objected to WETS broadcasting the program.  However, the show has also attracted a base of local supporters, who have formed a "Democracy Now Tri-Cities" group dedicated to keeping the program on the air.  This group has urged WETS not to succumb to ideological pressure to censor liberal opinions that are otherwise seldom heard in the region. WETS is the home station of Your Weekly Constitutional, a constitutional law show produced in collaboration with Montpelier.

As of February 1, 2010, WETS changed its weekday format to news and information programming. Previously the station had aired classical music in the weekday mornings and evenings and Americana music in the afternoons, with a blues program ("Blue Monday") on Monday afternoons. Most weekend programming was not affected by this change. In the fall of 2011, WETS began broadcasting three HD channels.  The first channel is a simulcast of the analog signal, the second is an all-Americana channel and the third is an all-classical channel.  WETS was the first station in the Tri-Cities radio market to offer HD broadcasts.  All three channels stream live on the Internet.

WETS first signed on the air on February 24, 1974.  The station has transmitted from a tower on Holston Mountain since 1981, from studios located in Richard F. Ellis Hall (opened in 1988, dedicated to the station's first director in 1993) on the south side of ETSU's campus; it originally operated from a two-story frame house.

As an annual fund raiser the station presents the Little Chicago Blues Festival at the Down Home each spring.

References

External links

ETS-FM
ETS-FM
NPR member stations
East Tennessee State University
1974 establishments in Tennessee
Radio stations established in 1974